Indian Heights is an unincorporated community located in the town of Lyndon, Juneau County, Wisconsin, United States. The community is part of the Ho-Chunk Nation.

References

Unincorporated communities in Juneau County, Wisconsin
Unincorporated communities in Wisconsin